Paganin is an Italian surname. Notable people with the surname include:

Antonio Paganin (born 1966), Italian footballer
Giorgio Paganin (born 1962), Italian speed skater
Giovanni Paganin (born 1955), Italian speed skater
Massimo Paganin (born 1970), Italian footballer

Italian-language surnames